Zahira College is the name of several schools in Sri Lanka including:

 Zahira College, Colombo
 Zahira College, Gampola
 Zahira College, Hambantota
 Zahira College, Kalmunai
 Zahira College, Matale
 Zahira College, Mawanella